Zhantanlin is a Buddhist temple located on Mount Jiuhua, in Qingyang County, Anhui, China.

History
The temple was originally in the reign of Kangxi Emperor (1662–1722) in the Qing dynasty (1644–1911). Most of the temple buildings were destroyed in wars during the ruling of Xianfeng Emperor (1851–1861). In 1886, it was restored and redecorated by Chan master Dingchan.

During the Republic of China, abbot Fuxing enlarged the temple. A Buddhist laity named Yi Guogan presented a plaque with the Chinese characters "" to the temple.

In 1983, it has been designated as a National Key Buddhist Temple in Han Chinese Area by the State Council of China.

Architecture

Mahavira Hall
The Mahavira Hall is the main hall in the temple, enshrining the Three Saints of Hua-yan.

Hall of the Three Sages of the West
The Hall of the Three Sages of the West, for the worship of the Three Sages of the West, namely Guanyin, Amitabha and Mahasthamaprapta, is an important hall in the temple.

Hall of Great Compassion

A statue of Thousand Armed and Eyed Guanyin is enshrined in the middle of the hall with 84 statues of Buddha standing on the left and right sides.

References

Bibliography
 

Buddhist temples on Mount Jiuhua
Buildings and structures in Chizhou
Tourist attractions in Chizhou
1886 establishments in China
19th-century Buddhist temples
Religious buildings and structures completed in 1886